Gunnar Sören Folke Strömmer (born 19 September 1972) is a Swedish politician of the Moderate Party. He has served as minister for justice in the cabinet of Ulf Kristersson since October 2022 and previously served as secretary-general of the Moderate Party from 2017 to 2022. He was chairman of the Moderate Youth League, the youth wing of the Moderate Party, from 1998 to 2000.

A lawyer by profession, Strömmer served as member of the executive board of the Moderate Party from 2015 to 2017, and as a party secretary in 2017-2022. Prior to that, he worked as a lawyer at the Gernandt & Danielsson law firm in Stockholm, and as manager of the non-profit Centrum för rättvisa.

In 2013, he was named "Swedish of the Year" by the Fokus magazine.

References

External links

|-

|-

|-

|-
 
|-

 

|-

21st-century Swedish lawyers
People from Örnsköldsvik Municipality
Living people
1972 births
Moderate Party politicians
Swedish Ministers for Justice